Riverbank Unified School District  is a public school district in Stanislaus County, California, United States.

References

External links
 

School districts in Stanislaus County, California